Edgard Joseph Émile Hérouard (18 March 1858 in Saint-Quentin, Aisne - 22 March 1932 in Paris) was a French marine biologist.

In 1889 he started work as a préparateur at the Sorbonne, earning his doctorate in natural sciences during the following year. From 1895 he served as chef des travaux pratiques de zoologie. In 1901 he was named vice-president of the Société zoologique de France, and soon afterwards was appointed assistant director of the Station biologique de Roscoff.
In 1910 he attained the title of associate professor, becoming a professor "without chair" in 1921.

Hérouard is known for his investigations of sea cucumbers, providing descriptions of numerous Holothurian species. Also, with Yves Delage (1854-1920), he is credited with describing the Order Hymenostomatida (1896).

Selected writings 
 Recherches sur les holothuries des côtes de France, 1889
 De l'excrétion chez les Holothuries, 1895
 Traite de zoologie concréte (with Yves Delage), 1896; several volumes.
 Holothuries provenant des campagnes de la Princesse-Alice (1892-1897), 1902
 Holothuries, 1906
 Sur les molpadides de Norvége, 1910.

References 

1858 births
1932 deaths
French zoologists
People from Saint-Quentin, Aisne